Deaf is the debut album by J. G. Thirlwell's You've Got Foetus on Your Breath, released in 1981 on Thirlwell's own Self Immolation Records label. Deaf, along with its follow-up Ache, was recorded with an 8-track recorder.

Both releases were limited editions: only 2,000 copies of the LP and 4,000 copies of the CD were produced. The Deaf LP is Self Immolation #WOMB OYBL 1.  The CD re-release is Ectopic Ents #ECT ENTS 012.

Thirsty Ear reissued the album as a CD in 1997 in the US.

Track listing 

The final track on the CD seems to approximate a locked groove, with the same few seconds of music repeated for the final 10 minutes.

Personnel 
Harlan Cockburn – engineering
J. G. Thirlwell (as You've Got Foetus On Your Breath) – instruments, production, illustrations

References

External links 
 

1981 debut albums
Foetus (band) albums
Albums produced by JG Thirlwell
Thirsty Ear Recordings albums